Arracacia papillosa is a plant species native to the Mexican State of Jalisco.

Arracacia papillosa is an herb up to 1 m tall. Flowers are purple. The species is unusual in the genus in having short, stiff hairs covering the fruit.

References

Apioideae
Endemic flora of Mexico
Flora of Jalisco
Taxa named by Lincoln Constance
Taxa named by Mildred Esther Mathias